The black-fronted tyrannulet (Phylloscartes nigrifrons) is a species of bird in the family Tyrannidae. It is found in the tepuis of southern Venezuela. Its natural habitat is subtropical or tropical moist montane forests.

References

black-fronted tyrannulet
Birds of the Tepuis
black-fronted tyrannulet
black-fronted tyrannulet
black-fronted tyrannulet
Taxonomy articles created by Polbot